Levantine Arabic vocabulary is the vocabulary of Levantine Arabic, the variety of Arabic spoken in the Levant.

Overview 
The lexicon of Levantine is overwhelmingly Arabic. Many words, such as verbal nouns (also called gerunds or masdar) are derived from a verb root. For instance   'school', from   'to study, to learn'.

However, it also includes layers of ancient indigenous languages: Aramaic (particularly Western Aramaic), classical Hebrew (Biblical and Mishnaic), Canaanite, Persian, Greek, and Latin. Since the early modern period, Levantine has borrowed from Turkish (due to the region's long history under the Ottoman Empire) as well as European languages, mainly English (notably in the fields of science and technology) and French (in Syria and Lebanon due to the French mandate), but also German, and Italian. With the establishment of Israel in 1948, there has also been a significant influence of Modern Hebrew on the Palestinian dialect spoken by Arab Israelis. Loanwords are gradually replaced with words of Arabic root. For instance, borrowings from Ottoman Turkish that were common in the 20th century have been largely replaced by Arabic words after the end of Ottoman Syria.

Lexical distance from MSA 
An analysis of the spoken lexicon of five-year-old native Palestinian speakers concluded that:
 40% of the words were unique to Palestinian and not present in MSA;
 40% of the spoken Palestinian words were related to terms in MSA but were different in between 1 and 6 phonological parameters (sound change, addition, or deletion);
 20% of the words were identical in Palestinian and MSA.

Levantine words coming from Classical Arabic have undergone three common phonological processes:
 Regressive vowel harmony: The first vowel /a/ has changed to /u/ in harmony with the following vowel /u/,
 Final vowel deletion: The final vowel /u/ is deleted, and
 Initial consonant addition: A voiced bilabial consonant is often added before present verb prefixes. It is /b/ in all forms except 1st person plural, where it is /m/.

Despite these differences, three scientific papers concluded, using various natural language processing techniques, that Levantine dialects (and especially Palestinian) were the closest colloquial varieties, in terms of lexical similarity, to MSA: one compared MSA to two Algerian dialects, Tunisian, Palestinian, and Syrian and found 38% of common words between Syrian and MSA and 52% between Palestinian and MSA; another compared MSA to Egyptian, Levantine, Gulf, and North African Arabic; and the other compared MSA to Algerian, Tunisian, Palestinian, Syrian, Jordanian, and Egyptian and found that Levantine dialects were very similar to each other and between 0.4 and 0.5 similarity between MSA and Palestinian.

Aramaic substrate 

Aramaic influence is significant, especially in rural areas. Aramaic words underwent morphophonemic adaptation when they entered Levantine; over time, it has become difficult to identify them. They belong to different fields of everyday life such as seasonal agriculture, housekeeping, tools and utensils, and Christian religious terms. Aramaic is still spoken in the Syrian villages of Maaloula, al-Sarkha, and Jubb'adin; near them, Aramaic borrowings are more frequent.

Examples of words of Aramaic origin include:   'heat';   'to undress';   'to stretch'. Aramaic also influenced the syntax of Levantine dialects. For instance, the usage of li- as a direct object marker is a typically Aramaic construction:  'I told his son',  'I saw your brother',  'the brother of somebody'.

Loanwords

Learned borrowings from MSA 

Levantine often borrows learned words from MSA, particularly in more formal settings. In modern and religious borrowings from MSA the original MSA pronunciation is usually preserved. For instance,  (Quran) is only pronounced /qurʾān/.

From English 

Contacts between Levantine and English started during the nineteenth century when the British ran academic and religious institutions in the Levant. More influence of English occurred during the British protectorate over Jordan and the British Mandate for Palestine. However, the borrowing process was low at the time as the number of British personnel was very small. Over the last few decades, English contact with Levantine has gained increasing momentum, leading to the introduction of many loanwords, particularly in the contexts of technology and entertainment.

From French 

Many French loanwords exist in Levantine, especially in Lebanese and to a lesser extent Syria due to the French Mandate for Syria and the Lebanon.

From Ottoman Turkish 

The vast majority of Turkish loans in Levantine date from the Ottoman Empire, which dominated the Levant and a large part of the Arab world for about four hundred years. The dissolution of the Ottoman Empire resulted in a rapid and drastic decrease in Turkish words due to the Arabization of the language and the negative perception of the Ottoman era among Arabs. However, Arabic-speaking minorities in Turkey (mainly in the Hatay Province) are still influenced by Turkish. Many Western words entered Arabic through Ottoman Turkish as Turkish was the main language for transmitting Western ideas into the Arab world. There are about 3,000 Turkish borrowings in Syrian Arabic, mostly in administration and government, army and war, crafts and tools, house and household, dress, and food and dishes.

From Modern Hebrew 

Palestinian Israelis use many Modern Hebrew loanwords. Modern Hebrew is now the main source of innovation in Palestinian Arabic in Israel, including for words originally derived from English. Most of the borrowed items are nouns and many are borrowed without any change. Hebrew loanwords can be written in Hebrew, Arabic, or Latin script, depending on the speaker and the context. Code-switching between Levantine and Hebrew is frequent. In one study, 2.7% of all words in conversations on WhatsApp and Viber were Hebrew borrowings, mostly nouns from the domains of education, technology, and employment.

Notes

References

Sources

External links 

Vocabulary
Lexis (linguistics)